Nagyigmánd is a village in Komárom-Esztergom county, Hungary. It is the site of an ancient earthwork fort.

References

External links

  in Hungarian
 Street map (Hungarian)

Populated places in Komárom-Esztergom County